Willa of Spoleto (also Willa of Tuscany) ( – 7 January 978) was the daughter of Boniface I, duke of Spoleto. Through marriage to Hubert, Duke of Spoleto Willa became duchess of Spoleto and margravine of Tuscany.

Family
Willa’s parents were Boniface I, duke of Spoleto and Waldrada, daughter of Rudolf I, king of Upper Burgundy. Thus her maternal uncle was Rudolph II of Burgundy, and his daughter Adelaide of Italy was her cousin.

Marriage and issue
Around 945 Willa married Hubert, an illegitimate son of King Hugh and Wandelmoda. Hubert and Willa at least two children:
Hugh, who succeeded Hubert as margrave of Tuscany;
Waldrada, who married Pietro IV Candiano, doge of Venice;
It is sometimes argued that Bertha, who married Margrave Arduin of Ivrea, future king of Italy, was also the daughter of Willa and Hubert.

Religious patronage
According to a diploma issued by Emperor Otto III in 998, Willa was the founder of the convent of San Ponziano in Lucca.
Willa was widowed, around 968, and her son Hugh succeeded Hubert as margrave of Tuscany. Willa moved with Hugh from Lucca to Florence, establishing this as the new capital of Tuscany. In 978 Willa founded the monastery of Badia Fiorentina in Florence to commemorate her late husband. 

Willa’s date of death is not known.

Notes

References
Liutprand of Cremona, Antapodosis, in J. Becker, ed., Die Werke Liutprands, MGH SS rer Germ 41 (Hannover, 1915). 
 
 
Brunhofer, Ursula: Arduin von Ivrea. Untersuchungen zum letzten italienischen Königtum des Mittelalters (Augsburg, 1999).
Goez Elke: Beatrix von Canossa und Tuszien. Eine Untersuchung zur Geschichte des 11. Jahrhunderts (Sigmaringen, 1995).
Hlawitschka, Eduard: Franken, Alemannen, Bayern und Burgunder in Oberitalien (774-962) (Freiburg im Breisgau, 1960).
Thiele, Andreas: Erzählende genealogische Stammtafeln zur europäischen Geschichte Band II, Teilband 2 Europäische Kaiser-, Königs- und Fürstenhäuser II Nord-, Ost- und Südeuropa (R.G. Fischer Verlag, 1994). 
 
 D. Carutti, Il conte Umberto (Biancamano) e il re Ardoino. Ricerche e documenti (Rome, 1884, 2nd ed., first published 1878).

Margraves of the Holy Roman Empire
10th-century Italian women